The sixth edition of the Caribbean Series (Serie del Caribe) was played in 1954. It was held from February 18 through February 23, featuring the champion baseball teams from Cuba (Alacranes del Almendares), Panama (Carta Vieja Yankees), Puerto Rico ,(Criollos de Caguas) and Venezuela (Lácteos de Pastora). Lácteos de Pastora were the champion of the Liga Occidental de Béisbol Profesional rather than the Venezuelan Professional Baseball League. The format consisted of 12 games, each team facing the other teams twice. The games were played at Sixto Escobar Stadium in San Juan, P.R.

Summary
Puerto Rico won the Series with a 4-2 record en route for a second straight championship (third overall). The Caguas club was managed by Mickey Owen and led by center fielder and Series MVP Jim Rivera, who posted a .400 batting average to lead the hitters. Caguas also received offensive support from 1B Víctor Pellot Power (.348) and 2B Jack Cassini (.333). Meanwhile, the pitching staff surrendered only 10 earned runs (2.00 ERA), being led by starters Corky Valentine (1-0, 1.00 ERA, five hits), Brooks Lawrence (1-0, 1.00, six hits) and Rubén Gómez (1-0, 2.00, five hits), while reliever Luis Arroyo added depth coming out of the bullpen (three appearances, 1-0, 0.00,  innings). Puerto Rico also had Jack Sanford (P) in addition to Félix Mantilla (SS), Charlie Neal (IF) and Luis (Canena) Márquez.

Cuba, piloted by Bobby Bragan, had a 3-3 record to tie the second place with Panama. The Cuban squad got fine work of P Conrado Marrero (1-0, five-hit shutout),  CF Sam Chapman (.391, homerun, .609 SLG) and RF Angel Scull (.391, .522 SLG). Other roster members included Julio Bécquer (1B), Joe Hatten (P), Cholly Naranjo (P) and Héctor Rodríguez (3B).

Panama was managed by Al Kubski and received a heroic pitching effort by starter Victor Stryska (2-0), who allowed just one earned run in 18 innings pitched. The attack was guided by 3B Joe Tuminelli (.391) and LF Bobby Prescott (.381), in an anemic lineup who batted a collective .255 average and scored 17 runs (fewest in the Series).

Venezuela was guided by Napoleón Reyes and finished in last place with a 2-4 record. Ramón Monzant (1-0, 3.00) and Ralph Beard (1-0, 7.20) got the victories, while Howie Fox collected a 2.58 ERA in two appearances but lose a decision. Bad luck starter Thornton Kipper dropped two decisions, losing his duels against Gómez (PR) and Stryska (PAN), while allowing four earned runs (2.12) in 17 innings. Besides, Emilio Cueche made two strong relief appearances and allowed just one earned run in  innings of work. 3B Luis García provided the lone offensive threat with a .348 BA and a .563 SLG, including nine RBI to lead the Series hitters. Venezuela included Ed Bailey (C), Vernon Benson (SS), Tommy Byrne (P/1B), Wally Moon (CF), Johnny Temple and rookie Luis Aparicio (SS), among others.

Final standings

Individual leaders

All-Star team

Scoreboards

Game 1, February 18

Game 2, February 18

Game 3, February 19

Game 4, February 19

Game 5, February 20

Game 6, February 20

Game 7, February 21

Game 8, February 21

Game 9, February 22

Game 10, February 22

Game 11, February 23

Game 12, February 23

See also
Ballplayers who have played in the Series

Sources
Antero Núñez, José. Series del Caribe. Jefferson, Caracas, Venezuela: Impresos Urbina, C.A., 1987.
Gutiérrez, Daniel. Enciclopedia del Béisbol en Venezuela – 1895-2006 . Caracas, Venezuela: Impresión Arte, C.A., 2007.

External links
Official site
Latino Baseball
Series del Caribe, Las (Spanish)

 
 

Caribbean
Caribbean Series
International baseball competitions hosted by Puerto Rico
1954 in Puerto Rican sports
1954 in Caribbean sport
Caribbean Series
Sports in San Juan, Puerto Rico